The costotransverse joint is the joint formed between the facet of the tubercle of the rib and the adjacent transverse process of a thoracic vertebra. 
The costotransverse joint is a plane type of synovial joint which, under physiological conditions, allows only gliding movement.

This costotransverse joint is present in all but the eleventh and twelfth ribs. The first ten ribs have two joints in close proximity posteriorly; the costovertebral joints and the costotransverse joints. This arrangement restrains the motion of the ribs allowing them to work in a parallel fashion during breathing. If a typical rib had only one joint posteriorly the resultant swivel action would allow a rib to be non-parallel with respect to the neighboring ribs making for a very inefficient breathing.

The intercostal nerves innervate the costotransverse joints. Therefore, therapeutic medial branch blocks are ineffectual.

The ligaments of the joint are:

 Articular capsule
 Costotransverse ligament
 Posterior costotransverse ligament
 Lateral costotransverse ligament
 Superior costotransverse ligament
 Inferior costotransverse ligament
 The costotransverse ligament
 Ligament of neck of rib
 Ligament of tubercle of rib

References

External links

Joints
Thorax (human anatomy)